Leslie Berland is the former CMO of Twitter. 

She was also Head of People at the company. Prior to that she spent over a decade in executive roles at AmEx establishing the financial service company’s initial social media strategies. (She also had executive PR roles at Ketchum and GCI Health. She is on the board of directors of the Ad Council. 

Forbes ranked Berland #3  in their World's Most Influential CMOs list. Fast Company ranked Berland sixth in their 100 Most Creative People in Business  for redefining the phrase social currency. She was featured in Advertising Age's Creativity 50 list. In 2018, she was appointed to the National Board of Directors at Make a Wish Foundation

References

Living people
Date of birth missing (living people)
Twitter, Inc. people
21st-century American businesspeople
21st-century American businesswomen
American technology businesspeople
Year of birth missing (living people)